Autovía MA-24 or Autovía de Acceso a Málaga Este is a Spanish highway that connects the Autovía A-7 at Cala del Moral, Málaga, with that same road at a further point. It is managed by the Spanish Government, and it is an important access to the eastern suburbs of Málaga City.

Exits

References 

Transport in Spain